Gabe Crate is a professional cartoonist, writer, director, and storyboard artist currently living and working in Santa Monica, California. He is most known for his work on the print comic version of The Tick during the late 1990s and for his participation in several Boston-based punk rock bands during the same period, most notably, A Global Threat. After parting ways with both The Tick and A Global Threat in 2001 and relocating to the west coast, Gabe pursued a career as an independent cartoonist and musician. In late 2004, Gabe established the independent comic publishing press Flophouse Comics, which saw its first releases in Spring, 2005.  He established Flophouse Productions LLC in 2015 and is currently touring the film festival circuit with his award-winning short film and directorial debut, "Move Me."

External links
Official site
Gabe Crate's live journal

American punk rock musicians
Living people
1977 births
American storyboard artists